Dichrorampha sylvicolana is a moth belonging to the family Tortricidae. The species was first described by Hermann von Heinemann in 1863.

It is native to Europe.

References

Grapholitini